John Franklin Witter (1906-1982) was a veterinarian specialist in avian medicine as well as a researcher and professor at the University of Maine, Orono.

Frank Wittner was born on June 11, 1906, in Frederick, Maryland, the eighth of nine children to Harry and “Jennie” (Mary Catherine Virginia) Miller Witter. He was raised on a farm, and his father was a professional livestock showman. Wittner was admitted into the University of Maryland in College Park where he earned his Bachelor of Science in Agriculture in 1928. In 1929, Witter enrolled in the veterinary school at Michigan State College in East Lansing and upon graduating in 1932 was immediately offered a faculty position at the University of Maine, eventually becoming the head of the newly created Department of Animal Pathology in 1953. As a faculty member, he published many papers on poultry health and pathology. He served as president and secretary-treasurer of the Maine Veterinary Medical Association. He retired in 1971. The new J. Franklin Witter Animal Science Center was named in his honor in 1974, as well as one of the Orono-Old Town Kiwanis Club auction barns. Witter died on September 29, 1982.

Resources 

1906 births
1982 deaths
American veterinarians
Male veterinarians
20th-century American scientists
People from Frederick, Maryland
Scientists from Maryland
University of Maryland, College Park alumni
Michigan State University alumni
University of Maine faculty